James Morgan Humphrey (September 21, 1819 – February 9, 1899) was an American lawyer and politician who served two terms as a U.S. Representative from New York from 1865 to 1869.

Early life and education 
Born in Holland, New York, Humphrey attended the common schools. Then he studied law, was admitted to the bar in 1847, and commenced practice in East Aurora, New York.

Political career 
He was District Attorney of Erie County from January 1, 1857 to December 31, 1859, and a member of the New York State Senate (31st D.) in 1864 and 1865.

Congress 
Humphrey was elected as a Democrat to the 39th and 40th United States Congresses, holding office from March 4, 1865, to March 3, 1869.

Later career and death 
He was appointed to the Superior court of Buffalo, New York, in 1871 and served until January 1, 1873. Afterwards he resumed the practice of law until 1894, when he retired.

He died in Buffalo, New York, February 9, 1899, and was buried at the Forest Lawn Cemetery, Buffalo.

Sources

External links 
 

1819 births
1899 deaths
Democratic Party New York (state) state senators
Politicians from Buffalo, New York
Erie County District Attorneys
New York (state) state court judges
Burials at Forest Lawn Cemetery (Buffalo)
Democratic Party members of the United States House of Representatives from New York (state)
19th-century American politicians
Lawyers from Buffalo, New York
19th-century American judges
19th-century American lawyers